Always Tomorrow is the fourth studio album by American rock duo Best Coast. It was released through Concord Music on February 21, 2020. It is the band's first studio album in five years. The singles "For the First Time", "Everything Has Changed" and "Different Light" preceded the album's release. The band began a tour in February 2020 in support of the album.

Background
Bethany Cosentino said that after finishing the California Nights album and touring commitments, she felt "creatively paralyzed. I couldn't write music. There was so much bubbling inside of me, so many things happening, so much to process, but I couldn't get any of it out", and believed "nothing was ever going to change". She later forced herself to write, coming up with the song "Everything Has Changed", and has called the album "the story of where I was and where I am now, as well as the struggles I am still learning to identify and figure out. [...] This album is about leaving the darkness for the light, but still understanding that nothing is ever going to be perfect." Cosentino also got sober and began a "recovery and self-care process", which is reflected in much of the lyrics of the album.

Critical reception
Tim Sendra of AllMusic commented on the "numbing sameness of the lyrical content", finding that Cosentino retreads the same subject matter—the "changes she's been through"—in each song, and that there are only hints of a "positive direction" or a change to her "slacker drawl vocal style she uses to deliver each self-obsessed observation". Conversely, Arielle Gordon of Pitchfork wrote that the album "showcases Cosentino's expanding range as a vocalist and songwriter" and that it is Cosentino's "musicianship and knack for melody that prevents these songs from turning to fluff".

Track listing

Charts

References

2020 albums
Best Coast albums